Robert Rice may refer to:

 Robert Rice (footballer) (born 1989), English footballer
 Robert Rice (coach), American college football and college basketball coach
 Robert H. Rice (1903–1994), American submarine commander
 Henry Burr (1882–1941), Canadian singer who used Robert Rice as a pseudonym
 Robert L. Rice (1929–2007), health club pioneer and philanthropist
 Robert V. Rice (born 1924), American biochemist
 Bobby Rice (born 1983), American actor
 Bobby G. Rice (born 1944), American country music singer-songwriter